Solar sharing is a way to finance a new solar power plant by pooling the investment resources of multiple people together. The target is to develop new solar energy and at the same time, share the economic benefits that the energy produces among those who contributed to the projects.

How solar sharing works
The solar sharing model is based on the idea of pooling the financial resources of multiple people together in order to be able to create a bigger and more economic solar farm.
A group of people come together to build a new solar power plant, and distribute construction costs amongst themselves. When the plant begins to produce energy, the revenue generated from the sales of that energy is redistributed within the group, in proportion to the contribution made to the project. The application of this model allows for reduced initial and maintenance costs, due to the economies of scale that are present in building one large solar power plant versus creating many smaller domestic installations.

Benefits of solar sharing
Solar sharing is achieving resounding success, although it is a recent model of development.
This is due to its specific characteristics that enable individuals, even ordinary citizens to become energy producers and enjoy the economic returns from it. This enables people in small societies to have solar-powered homes.
For many people, it is difficult to achieve a domestic installation due to:
 lack of space;
 architectural constraints / urban / landscaped areas and buildings;
 geographical location and/or territorial unfavorable;
 bureaucratic complications related to permissions and the network connection.

It is seen as a huge advantage to purchase a share of a medium or large solar plant. This choice may lead not only to covering the economic costs of domestic energy but also to generating additional earnings.

Examples of solar sharing
Several companies around the world are contributing to the realization of solar sharing and producing clean energy for the planet. Some models involve installing solar panels at ground level, in large open spaces. Other companies install the panels on rooftops.

There are also numerous examples of cooperatives and associations that offer local financing or a few individual plants. These are operating in Italy, Japan, and the United States.

Solar sharing for both food and clean energy production 
The purpose of this research was to examine the performance of agrivoltaic systems, which produce crops and electricity simultaneously, by installing stilt-mounted photovoltaic (PV) panels on farmland. As PV power stations enjoy remarkable growth, land occupation to establish solar farms will intensify the competition for land resources between food and clean energy production. The results of this research showed, however, that the stilt-mounted agrivoltaic system can mitigate the trade-off between crop production and clean energy generation even when applied to corn, a typical shade-intolerant crop. The research was conducted at a 100-m2 experimental farm with three sub-configurations: no modules (control), low module density, and high module density. In each configuration, 9 stalks/m2 were planted 0.5 m apart. The biomass of corn stover grown in the low-density configuration was larger than that of the control configuration by 4.9%. Also, the corn yield per square meter of the low-density configuration was larger than that of the control by 5.6%. The results of this research should encourage more conventional farmers, clean energy producers, and policymakers to consider adopting stilt-mounted PV systems, particularly in areas where land resources are relatively scarce.

Research significance and objectives 
As PV power stations continue to enjoy remarkable growth, land occupation intended for solar farms will intensify competition for land resources between food and clean energy production. The question remains as to how competition for land resources between food and energy production can be resolved. Although PV systems require less land than other renewable energy options, in reality, commercial PV power stations can occupy a considerable land area at local scales. In many cases, the most suitable sites for solar power plants, which perform optimally with long daylight hours and minimal cloud cover, are classified as agricultural land.

This presents an issue, in that land supporting viable and diverse agriculture is likely to have more value as agricultural land than as a solar farm. This competition could be particularly serious in densely populated regions, mountainous areas, and small inhabited islands.

The fundamental problem tackled by this research was how to reduce competition for land resources between food production and PV power generation. In other words, the main objective was to identify a PV system that can help reduce the tension between limited land resources and increasing demands for food and clean energy. Although commercial PV power stations nevertheless occupy vast tracts of land at local scales, this problem could be solved by agrivoltaic systems.

References

External links
International projects that are using solar sharing
 Abundance Generation (United Kingdom)
 Power Clouds (Global)
 Solar Mosaic (USA)
 Yeloha (USA)

Energy cooperatives
Photovoltaics